The River Brenig (Afon Brenig) is a tributary river of the River Teifi and runs through the market town of Tregaron in Ceredigion, Wales.  It is formed from the confluence of the Afon Groes and Afon Berwyn in the foothills of the Cambrian Mountains.

Fishing
The river was once frequented by Atlantic salmon but their numbers have declined. Brown trout are prevalent in the river and larger specimens can be caught in the narrower parts where the water runs deeper. Several  fish have been caught along with a local record  fish which can be seen mounted in the Talbot Hotel. Recently a  fish was caught in the river. Many eels can also be found.

Flood defence
A £1.6M development project has begun to make the river less likely to flood in the centre of Tregaron.

Rally stage
The area was used as a special stage during the 2015 Wales Rally GB.

External links 
Photos of the River Brenig and surrounding area on geograph.org.uk

Brenig
Rally GB